Algodres is a Portuguese civil parish (freguesia) in the municipality of Fornos de Algodres, district of Guarda. The population in 2011 was 349, in an area of 10.15 km2.

References 

Freguesias of Fornos de Algodres